In geometry, the truncated tetrapentagonal tiling is a uniform tiling of the hyperbolic plane. It has Schläfli symbol of t0,1,2{4,5} or tr{4,5}.

Symmetry

There are four small index subgroup constructed from [5,4] by mirror removal and alternation. In these images fundamental domains are alternately colored black and white, and mirrors exist on the boundaries between colors.

A radical subgroup is constructed [5*,4], index 10, as [5+,4], (5*2) with gyration points removed, becoming orbifold (*22222), and its direct subgroup [5*,4]+, index 20, becomes orbifold (22222).

Related polyhedra and tiling

See also

Uniform tilings in hyperbolic plane
List of regular polytopes

References
 John H. Conway, Heidi Burgiel, Chaim Goodman-Strass, The Symmetries of Things 2008,  (Chapter 19, The Hyperbolic Archimedean Tessellations)

External links 

 Hyperbolic and Spherical Tiling Gallery
 KaleidoTile 3: Educational software to create spherical, planar and hyperbolic tilings
 Hyperbolic Planar Tessellations, Don Hatch

Hyperbolic tilings
Isogonal tilings
Truncated tilings
Uniform tilings